Crout is a surname. Notable people with the surname include:

Alfred Crout Harmer (1825–1900), American politician, a Republican member of the United States House of Representatives from Pennsylvania
Henry Crout (fl. 1612–1617), English settler, explorer
John Crout (1899-1987), American engineer
Prescott Durand Crout (1907–1984), American mathematician

See also
Crout matrix decomposition, a matrix decomposition